The Hamara Youth Access Point (Hyap) is a drop-in centre for teens in Leeds, West Yorkshire, England, operated by the Hamara Healthy Living Centre, an Islamic charity partly funded by the UK government. The drop-in centre was frequented by several of the suspects in the 7 July 2005 London bombings.

2005 controversy
In 2005, police searched the premises and confiscated items such as computer hard drives for forensic investigation  Both Shehzad Tanweer, 22, and Hasib Hussain, 19, who have since been proven to be suicide bombers, frequented Hyap, according to police. The Leeds teacher Mohammed Sadique Khan, 30, also identified by police as a suicide bomber, acted as a mentor to youths at the centre.

The centre is directly across the street from a mosque, and it is said that a request that Khan and others should stop having political activities in the mosque, including community meetings opposed to UK policy in Iraq, but they then moved them to the centre.

The Hyap's status permitted it to apply for grants from the UK government for various program monies totalling more than £1 million.

References 

 

Leeds
July 2005 London bombings